The 2015 ADAC Opel Rallye Cup season was the third season of the one-make series for Opel Adam rally cars.

This season was notable for the participation of Yannick Neuville, younger brother of World Rally Championship winning driver Thierry Neuville. The title was won by German Julius Tannert and Luxembourger co-driver Jennifer Thielen. Tannert won 6 of the 8 rallies to be held in 2015, finishing 113 points clear of their next best competitors. Samuli Vuorisalo finished as runner-up, while Yannick Neuville finished third with a win at Rallye Vogelsberg. Jacob Madsen was the only other winner, winning the Ostsee Rallye.

Calendar

Drivers

Championship standings
Points were awarded to the top 20 finishers on the basis below:

 Additional points were awarded to the top three finishers on each event's Power Stage, on a 3–2–1 basis. Five points were also awarded to the driver with most stage wins at an event.

References

External links
 ADAC Motorsport website

2015 in rallying
2015 in German motorsport